Tactiq is the debut studio album of Society Burning, released on July 15, 1997 by Re-Constriction Records. The secret song located on track sixty-nine is a cover of Adam Ants's "Stand and Deliver", which is a reworked version of what appeared on the Shut Up Kitty compilation.

Reception
Sonic Boom praised the band for exploring new sounds, saying "by not choosing to remain stuck in a musical rut, the band has chosen to stride forth into new musical territory without forgetting their original musical roots." Aiding & Abetting gave the album a more mixed review, criticizing the direction and writing as being inconsistent.

Track listing

Personnel 
Adapted from the Tactiq liner notes.

Society Burning
 Dave Creadeau – vocals, synthesizer, cover art
 Boom chr Paige – vocals, synthesizer, guitar, cover art
Additional musicians
 Steven Seibold – production and keyboards (7)

Production and additional personnel
 Mark Derryberry – engineering (9)
 DJ Twitch – co-producer (6)
 J. Holder – cover art

Release history

References

External links 
 Tactiq at Discogs (list of releases)
 Tactiq at Bandcamp

1997 debut albums
Society Burning albums
Re-Constriction Records albums